Bondgate Tower also known as the Hotspur Tower or the Hotspur Gateway in reference to Sir Henry Percy commonly known as Harry Hotspur son of the 1st Earl of Northumberland and father of the 2nd Earl of Northumberland.  Although commonly called a tower it is actually a gatehouse of three stories constructed of stone and consists of a recessed archway flanked by two polygonal towers. It is located in Alnwick, Northumberland in the United Kingdom. The gatehouse crosses the road called Bondgate known by its road number as the B6346 the main road of Alnwick and low height traffic can pass though its entrance while tall height traffic take divestions to get past. A licence was granted in the 1430s by Henry V to Henry Percy 2nd Earl of Northumberland to wall the town and add battlements. These took fifty years to complete, with Bondgate Tower being finished around 1450.

Gallery

References 

Grade I listed buildings in Northumberland
Alnwick (district)
Buildings and structures completed in 1450
Gatehouses (architecture)